Tridentiger brevispinis is a species of goby native to marine, brackish and fresh waters along the coasts of northeastern Asia.  This species can reach a length of  TL.  It is important to local commercial fisheries.

References

brevispinis
Fish of the Pacific Ocean
Fish of East Asia
Fish of Japan
Fish of Russia
Fish described in 1972

ja:ヌマチチブ